The 740s decade ran from January 1, 740, to December 31, 749.

Significant people
 Hisham
 Al-Walid II
 Yazid III
 Ibrahim ibn al-Walid
 Marwan II
 Sulayman ibn Hisham
 Yazid al-Afqam
 Maslama ibn Hisham
 Sa'id ibn Hisham
 Pope Zachary
 Leo III the Isaurian
 Constantine V

References

Sources